Russell Tracey McCutcheon (born 1961) is a Canadian religion scholar with a PhD in religious studies from the University of Toronto in 1995.

Biography
He is a professor and was department chair from 2001 to 2009 at the University of Alabama. He was one of the editors of the quarterly periodical Method & Theory in the Study of Religion, 1997–2001. In 2005, McCutcheon was elected President of the Council of Societies for the Study of Religion, headquartered at Rice University. He is the founder and series editor for the anthology series, Critical Categories in the Study of Religion.

He has been noted for a controversy concerning methodology in the field of religious studies.  This controversy centred on a rather polemical exchange between McCutcheon and Robert A. Orsi, who held a teaching position at Harvard University and Harvard Divinity School, with Orsi referring to McCutcheon's book, The Discipline of Religion, as "chilling". Orsi also made the comment, "the assumption appears to be that the scholar of religion by virtue of his or her normative epistemology, theoretical acuity, and political knowingness, has the authority and the right to make the lives of others the objects of his or her scrutiny. He or she theorizes them." McCutcheon responded with a paper included in the Journal of the American Academy of Religion entitled, "It's a Lie. There's No Truth in It! It's a Sin! On the Limits of the Humanistic Study of Religion and the Costs of Saving Others from Themselves".

Books 

with Willi Braun, Guide to the Study of Religion, London; New York: Continuum, 2000.
 The Discipline of Religion: Structure, Meaning, Rhetoric, London; New York: Routledge, 2003.
 Studying Religion: An Introduction, London; Oakville, CT: Equinox, 2007
 with William E. Arnal, The Sacred is the Profane: The Political Nature of "Religion" . New York: Oxford University Press, 2013.
 A Modest Proposal on Method: Essaying the Study of Religion, Leiden; Boston: Brill, 2015.

References

1961 births
Canadian religion academics
Living people
Queen's University at Kingston alumni
Religious studies scholars
University of Alabama faculty
University of Toronto alumni